Pakistan Alpine Institute is a Pakistani non-profit organization working under the umbrella of Islamabad Sport Climbing Association and Islamabad Olympic Association.

They serve as a platform for mountains lovers. Provide services and training for alpine sports including sport climbing, rock climbing, bouldering, indoor climbing, trekking, mountaineering, mix alpine style climbing, adventure traveling, rowing, caving, skiing, rafting, mountain biking and paragliding.

It is only organization of Alpine Sports in Pakistan which is headed by a lady 

Imran Junaidi and Usman Tariq are founder members of Pakistan Alpine Institute.

Pakistan's First Big Wall Climbing Expedition 

Imran Junaidi, Vice President (Expedition) and Usman Tariq, Vice President (Training) have completed Pakistan's First Big Wall Climbing Expedition at Trango Braak, Gilgit Baltitstan, Pakistan.

Rock Climbing Routes Setting 

Members of Pakistan Alpine Institute have developed various routes at Margalla Hills, Islamabad from F 4a to 8a.

First Ever Bouldering Wall Climbing Competition
First ever bouldering wall climbing competition in  Pakistan was sponsored by Pakistan Alpine Institute in terms of technical support. The competition was organized in February, 2014.

First Summit of Trango Tower by Local Rock Climbers
Members of Pakistan Alpine Institute climbed Trango Towers in the year 2014 which is considered as first summit by the local rock climbers. Imran Junaidi, Usman Tariq and Owais Khattak were members of the team to attempt Trango Tower. However, only Imran Junaidi and Usman Tariq could reach to the summit.

References 

Sports organisations of Pakistan